Mario Zatelli (21 December 1912 – 7 January 2004) was a French football (soccer) player and manager.

Born in Sétif, Algeria, but of Italian origin, he mostly played for Olympique de Marseille. He was in the roster for the 1938 FIFA World Cup; never appeared. He capped (scored 1 goal) for France in 1939.  He later managed Olympique de Marseille in the 1970s and won one Ligue 1 and Coupe de France in 1972.

He died in Sainte-Maxime, Var, French Riviera, at 91 years old.

External links and references

Profile on French federation official site

1912 births
2004 deaths
French people of Italian descent
Pieds-Noirs
French footballers
France international footballers
Association football forwards
Olympique de Marseille players
Racing Club de France Football players
Ligue 1 players
1938 FIFA World Cup players
French football managers
OGC Nice managers
Olympique de Marseille managers
Footballers from Sétif